Buddy Brown can refer to:

 Buddy Brown (equestrian) (born 1956), American Olympic equestrian
 Buddy Brown (musician) (born 1982), American musician
 Buddy Brown (offensive guard) (born 1950), American football player
 Buddy Brown (offensive guard, born 1925) (1925–2004), American football player